Talbot was a British-French automobile marque.

Talbot may also refer to:

People

As a given name
 Talbot Badger (fl. 1621–1656), English politician 
 Talbot Bowes (1560–1638), English politician
 Talbot Dilworth-Harrison (1886–1975), Archdeacon of Chesterfield
 Talbot Duckmanton (1921–1995), Australian broadcaster and administrator
 Talbot Hamlin (1889–1956), American architect, architectural historian, writer, and educator
 Talbot Hobbs (1864–1938), Australian architect
 Talbot Henry Fox (1800–1877), English scientist, inventor and photography pioneer 
 Talbot Hunter (1884–1928), Canadian college hockey, lacrosse, and soccer coach
 Talbot Jennings (1894–1985), American playwright and screenwriter 
 Talbot Lewis (1877–1956), English cricketer
 Talbot Mundy (1879–1940), English-American writer
 Talbot O'Farrell (1878–1952), English singer and actor 
 Talbot Mercer Papineau (1883–1917), Canadian lawyer
 Talbot Pendleton (fl. 1910), American football player
 Talbot Pepys (1583–1666), English politician 
 Talbot Peterson (fl. 1964–1972), American politician 
 Talbot Baines Reed (1852–1893), English writer
 Talbot Rothwell (1916–1981), English screenwriter
 Talbot Smith (1899–1978), American politician 
 Talbot Yelverton, 1st Earl of Sussex (1690–1731), English peer and member of the House of Lords

As a surname

In peerages
 Earl Talbot
 Baron Talbot
 Baron Talbot of Malahide

Places
 Talbot (ward), a former electoral ward of Trafford, Greater Manchester, England
 Port Talbot, a town in West Glamorgan, Wales, UK
 Talbot Lake (Petite rivière Pikauba), a lake crossed by Petite rivière Pikauba in Lac-Pikauba, Quebec, Canada
 Talbot, Indiana, a town in Indiana, U.S.
 Talbot, Michigan, an unincorporated community
 Talbot, Victoria, a town in Victoria, Australia

Science
 Talbot (crater), a lunar crater
 Talbot (unit), a non standard photometric unit of luminous energy
 Talbot cavity, an optical cavity
 Talbot effect, a near-field diffraction phenomenon

Other
 Talbot (dog), an extinct, white hunting dog
 Talbot School of Theology, an evangelical Christian theological seminary in La Mirada, California, U.S.
 HMS Talbot, the name of six ships of the Royal Navy
 USS Talbot, the name of three ships of the US Navy
 Château Talbot, Bordeaux wine producer, archaically named simply Talbot
 A house of Adams' Grammar School, Newport, Shropshire, UK
Waggonfabrik Talbot, German rolling stock manufacturer, also known as Bombardier Talbot since being acquired by Bombardier GmbH
 Talbot wagon, common name for a type of self discharging railway wagon, originally developed by Waggonfabrik Talbot

See also 
 Talbot County (disambiguation)
 Talbot River (disambiguation)
 Talbots, a retail chain for women's clothing and accessories